Zaritap is a village in the Vayk Municipality of the Vayots Dzor Province of Armenia. For a time the village was renamed in honor of Meshadi Azizbekov, an early Bolshevik and one of the 26 Baku Commissars. In the vicinity are 13th-century khachkars and the traces of an old fort.

Etymology 
The village was previously known as Azizbekov, Pashalu and Pashaghu.

References

External links 
 

Populated places in Vayots Dzor Province